Bill Meridian is a financial astrologer. He began to study astrology in 1972 as he entered Wall Street after he received his MBA at NYU. He trained as a bioenergetic therapist with Dr. John Pierrakos in New York City for 7 years. Bill began applying computers to financial astrology in 1983 eventually designing the AstroAnalyst. He wrote several books, including Planetary Stock Trading, which uses company first trade dates to pick winners.

References

Living people
American financial analysts
American astrologers
20th-century astrologers
21st-century astrologers
Year of birth missing (living people)